Stetsko is a ukrainian surname.

Notable Ukrainian people with the surname include:
Bohdan Stetsko (born 1943), actor
Dmytro Stetsko (born 1943), painter
Slava Stetsko (1920–2003), politician
Vira Stetsko (born 1956), art critic, museum worker, public figure
Vasyl Stetsko (1923–1994), manager
Vasyl Stetsko (born 1950), painter
Yaroslav Stetsko (1912–1986), politician

And also Belarusian people:
Lanita Stetsko (born 1993), chess player

See also
 

Ukrainian-language surnames